The Sky High of Arsion Championship was a women's professional wrestling championship owned by the Hyper Visual Fighting Arsion promotion. Like most professional wrestling championships, the title was won as a result of a scripted match. The championship, which was meant for high-flying wrestlers, was introduced on September 23, 1999, when Chaparita Asari defeated Ayako Hamada in the finals of a tournament to become the inaugural champion. During the next four years, there were six reigns shared among five different wrestlers. The title was retired when Arsion went out of business on June 22, 2003, making Akino the final champion in the title's history. The title belt was later awarded as a trophy to Dark Angel, after she defeated Princesa Sujei at an Estrella★Japan event on April 5, 2010.

Reigns
Chaparita Asari was the first champion in the title's history. Akino holds the records for most reigns, with two, and for the longest reign in the title's history at 490 days, achieved on her second reign. Ayako Hamada holds the record for the shortest reign at 89 days. Overall, there were six reigns shared among five different wrestlers.

Title history

Combined reigns

See also
High Speed Championship

Footnotes

References

External links
Sky High of Arsion Championship history at Wrestling-Titles.com
Sky High of Arsion Championship history at Solie's Title Histories

Arsion championships
Women's professional wrestling championships